The 1966 NCAA University Division baseball tournament was played at the end of the 1966 NCAA University Division baseball season to determine the national champion of college baseball.  The tournament concluded with eight teams competing in the College World Series, a double-elimination tournament in its twentieth year.  Eight regional districts sent representatives to the College World Series with preliminary rounds within each district serving to determine each representative.  These events would later become known as regionals.  Each district had its own format for selecting teams, resulting in 28 teams participating in the tournament at the conclusion of their regular season, and in some cases, after a conference tournament.  The twentieth tournament's champion was Ohio State, coached by Marty Karow.  The Most Outstanding Player was Steve Arlin of Ohio State.

Tournament
The opening rounds of the tournament were played across eight district sites across the country, each consisting of between two and four teams. The winners of each District advanced to the College World Series.

Bold indicates winner.

District 1 at Boston, MA

District 2 at Princeton, NJ

District 3 at Gastonia, NC

District 4 at Columbus, OH

District 5 at Stillwater, OK

District 6 at Houston, TX

District 7 at  Tucson, AZ
Preliminary rounds at Greeley, CO and Laramie, WY.

District 8 at Los Angeles, CA

College World Series

Participants

Results

Bracket

Game results

All-Tournament Team
The following players were members of the All-Tournament Team.

Notable players
 Arizona: Eddie Leon, Mike Paul
 North Carolina:
 Northeastern:
 Ohio State: Steve Arlin, Chuck Brinkman, Russ Nagelson, Bo Rein
 Oklahoma State: Larry Burchart
 Southern California: Oscar Brown, Ray Lamb, 
 St. John's:
 Texas: Gary Moore

See also
 1966 NAIA World Series

References

NCAA Division I Baseball Championship
1966 NCAA University Division baseball season
Baseball in Houston